Børge is a male Norwegian and Danish given name, a variant of Birger. The Swedish spelling is Börje.

Persons with the given name Børge 

Børge Brende (born 1965), minister in the Norwegian government
Børge Møller Grimstrup (1906–1972), Danish film actor
Børge Holm (1910–1971), Danish boxer
Børge Jessen (1907–1993), Danish mathematician
Børge Mathiesen (1918–1962), Danish football player
Børge Monberg (1905–1990), Danish field hockey player
Børge Müller (1909–1963), Danish screenwriter
Børge Ring (1921–2018), Danish short film writer
Børge Rosenbaum (1909–2000), birth name of Danish entertainer Victor Borge
Børge Raahauge Nielsen (1920–2010), Danish rower
Børge Ousland (born 1962), Norwegian polar explorer, photographer and writer

See also
Borge (disambiguation)
Borg (disambiguation)
Borger (disambiguation)

Danish masculine given names
Norwegian masculine given names